C25K, short for Couch to 5K, is a mobile app which contains training plans that gradually progress toward a 5 kilometre (3.1 mile) run over nine weeks. The app, created by Zen Labs, is based on the Couch to 5K running plan from CoolRunning.com. It is one of the highest-rated health and fitness apps available on Android and iOS.

The NHS in the UK provides downloadable podcasts and a smartphone app (Android and iOS) for the plan.

The Couch to 5K running plan was created by Josh Clark in 1996. He developed the plan for new runners as motivation  through manageable expectations. The plan aims to get the user working out for 20 to 30 minutes, three days a week. The daily workouts start with a five-minute warm-up walk and works up to running five kilometres without a walking break within nine weeks. Clark started the website Kick and featured C25K on the site. In 2001, Kick merged with Cool Running, a New England-based running site.

Clark later sold his stake in Cool Running and the Couch to 5K program. As of 2016, the C25K app has been used by over 5 million people.

References

Fitness apps
Sports software
Road running
Mobile applications